Power Trio is a jazz album by pianist John Hicks, bassist Cecil McBee and drummer Elvin Jones recorded in 1990 and released on the Novus label.

Reception 
The AllMusic review stated "This summit recording by pianist John Hicks, drummer Elvin Jones, and bassist Cecil McBee might not always hit the heights, but it still impresses with a fine repertoire and quality playing... In spite of a few musical missteps and the somewhat tinny sound of Hicks' piano, this fine trio recording still comes highly recommended".

Track listing 
 "Cousin Mary" (John Coltrane)6:34  
 "After the Rain" (Coltrane)8:07  
 D' Bass-ic Blues" (Cecil McBee)6:42   
 "Duke's Place" (Duke Ellington, Bob Thiele, Ruth Roberts, Bill Katz)9:38  
 "Chelsea Bridge" (Billy Strayhorn)8:37  
 "After the Morning" (John Hicks)7:28

Personnel 
John Hickspiano
Cecil McBeebass
Elvin Jonesdrums

References 

John Hicks (jazz pianist) albums
Cecil McBee albums
Elvin Jones albums
1991 albums
Novus Records albums
Albums produced by Bob Thiele